There are hot springs on all continents and in many countries around the world. Countries that are renowned for their hot springs include Turkey, Honduras, Canada, Chile, Hungary, Iceland, Israel, Bulgaria, Japan, Taiwan, New Zealand, India, Romania, Fiji and the United States, but there are interesting and unique hot springs in many other places as well.

Africa

Algeria 
 Hammam Essalihine (Thermes de Flavius), 35.4403°N 7.0844°E
 Hammam Chellala (Thermes Chellala)
 Hammam Guedjima (Thermes Guedjima)
 N'Gaous (Source de Saïda)
 Guelma (Source de Guelma)

Democratic Republic of the Congo 
 Uvira, South Kivu province. (275 to 369 °C) 
 Kambo, North Kivu, in North Kivu province. (150 to 270 °C)

Egypt 
 Oyoun Mossa (Moses Springs)
 Hammam Pharaon (Pharaoh Bath)
 Hammam Musa (Moses' Bath)

Eswatini (Swaziland)
There are thirteen developed and undeveloped hot spring pools in Eswatini (Swaziland). All are sulphur springs with temperatures ranging from 26 °C to 52 °C.
 Mkoba spring
 Mvuntshini spring
 Ezulwini spring
 Lobamba spring
 Mawelawela spring
 Ngwempisi spring
 Mpopoma spring
 Mbondela spring
 Madubula spring
 Fairview spring
 Siphofaneni spring
 Mbekelweni spring
 Mbikwakhe hot spring

Ethiopia 

 Sodere (Oromo: Sodaree) a spa town in central Ethiopia. Located approximately 25 kilometres south of Adama and 120 kilometres southeast of Addis Ababa in the East Shewa Zone of the Oromia Region, this town has a latitude and longitude of 8°24′N 39°23′E with an elevation of 1466 metres above sea level. It is one of five settlements in Nannawa Adama. Sodere
Dallol Hot Springs at Dallol volcano, Afar Region, Ethiopia

Morocco 
 Moulay Yacoub hot springs
 Sidi Harazem hot spring
 Ain al-Ati hot springs in Erfoud
 Abayou
 Ain Allah
 Ain Salama
 Fezouane

Nigeria 
 Ikogosi Warm Springs
 Wikki Warm Springs

Rwanda 
 Mashyuza Hot Springs
 Nyakabuye Hot Springs, near Cyangugu
 Bugarama Hot Springs, near Cyangugu

South Africa 
 Aliwal North, Eastern Cape
Brandvlei, Worcester area, Western Cape
 Caledon Spa
Goudini Spa, Worcester area, Western Cape
Montagu, Western Cape
 Tshipise, Limpopo
 Warmbaths, Limpopo

Tanzania 

 Chemka Hot Springs also known as Maji Moto, and as Kikuletwa Hotsprings, in the Kilimanjaro region, 40 km from Moshi.

Tunisia 
 Abdelkader Hot Springs Gabes,  near Gabes
 Abdelkader Hot Springs Ichkeul, near Bizert
 Abdelkader Hot Springs, near Tozeur

Uganda 
 Ihimba Hot Springs
 Kitagata Hot Springs
 Nyamasizi Hot Springs
 Kibiro Hot Springs
 Buranga Hot Springs
 Kagamba Warm Spring
 Bubaare Hot Spring
 Karungu Hot Springs
 Rubaare Hot Springs
 Birara Hot Springs
 Kisiizi Hot Springs
 Minera Hot Springs
 Kanyineabalongo Hot Springs
 Kiruruma Hot Springs
 Kabuga (Muhokya) Hot Springs
 Kibenge (Kyiriba Kya Kyathumba) Hot Springs
 Rwagimba Hot Springs
 Rwimi Warm Springs
 Panyamulu Hot Springs

A scholarly paper with a map of over twenty geothermal areas in Uganda.

Zambia 
 Gwisho Hot-Springs

Zimbabwe
 Hot Springs, Manicaland

Americas

Brazil 
 Marcelino Ramos, Rio Grande do Sul.
 Piratuba, Santa Catarina state.

Canada

Alberta
 Banff Upper Hot Springs (Banff National Park), near the Town of Banff
 Cave and Basin National Historic Site, Near Banff, Alberta
 Miette Hot Springs, near Jasper, Alberta

British Columbia
 Ahousat Hot Springs, Ahousat (Gibson Marine Provincial Park)
 Ainsworth Hot Springs & Cody Caves, south of Kaslo
 Bishop Bay Hot Springs, located in Devastation Channel, south of Kitimat, North Coast
 Boulder Creek Hot Springs (aka Pebble Creek Hot Springs & Keyhole Hot Springs) in the Pemberton Valley
 Brandywine Creek Hot Springs
 Canyon Hot Springs & Albert Canyon, near Revelstoke
 Dewar Hot Springs, Purcell Mountains
 Fairmont Hot Springs, near Invermere
 Frizzell Hotsprings, lower Skeena River
 Harrison Hot Springs, north of Agassiz
 Hotspring Island, Haida Gwaii
 Iskut River Hot Springs
 Lakelse Hot Springs, Terrace
 Liard River Hot Springs
 Lussier Hot Springs in Whiteswan Lake Provincial Park
 Meager Creek Hot Springs northwest of Pemberton
 Mount Cayley Hot Springs
 Mount Layton Hot Springs, near Kitimat
 Nascall Hot Springs, located in Dean Channel
 Nakusp and vicinity, along the Arrow Lakes:
 Coyote Springs
 Halcyon Hot Springs
 Halfway River
 Nakusp Hot Springs
 Octopus Creek
 Upper Halfway River
 Wilson Lake
 Pitt River Hot Springs, on the upper Pitt River
 Prophet River Hot Springs, Alaska Highway
 Radium Hot Springs, Columbia Valley
 Ram Creek Hot Springs, Skookumchuck
 Ramsay Hot Springs near Ahousat
 Shearwater Hot Springs, south of Kitimat, North Coast
 Sherwin Hot Springs, west side of Kootenay Lake, north of Ainsworth Hot Springs
 Skookumchuck Hot Springs (aka Saint Agnes Well & T'sek Hot Spring) between Pemberton and Port Douglas near the town of Skatin (formerly Skookumchuck)
 Sloquet Hot Springs, east of Pemberton between Skatin and Port Douglas
 Stikine Hot Springs in Choquette Hot Springs Provincial Park
 Tallheo Hot Springs, South Bentinck Arm
 Toad River Hot Springs, Alaska Highway
 Weewanie Hot Springs

Northwest Territories
 Kraus Hot Springs
 Rabbitkettle Hot Springs, Nahanni National Park

Yukon
 Takhini Hot Springs

Chile 

There are more than 275 hot springs registered in Chile.
 North Zone, Chile – Atacama Desert
 Mamiña
 Pica
 Puritama
 Socos
 El Tatio
 Central Zone, Chile – near Santiago
 Jahuel
 Cauquenes
 Corazón
 Chillán
 South Zone, Chile – near Volcanoes and Lakes
 Tolhuaca
 Malalcahuello
 Termas de Río Blanco
 Termas de Molulco (ei. Termas de Balboa)
 Pucón area
 Termas de San Sebastián
 Huife
 Menetúe
 Termas de San Luis
 Palguín
 Termas Geométricas, near Coñaripe
 Termas del Rincón
 Termas Vergara
 Seven Lakes area
 Coñaripe
 Termas de Liquiñe
 Chihuío
 Llifén
 Puyehue Lake area
 Los Baños – destroyed by the 2011–2012 Puyehue-Cordón Caulle eruption
 Puyehue Hot Springs
 Aguas Calientes
 Puyuhuapi
 Quitralco

Colombia
 Termales del Nevado del Ruiz, Manizales
 Termales del Otoño, Manizales, Caldas.
 Termales El Escondite, Samaná, Caldas.
 Termales de Santa Mónica, Choachi, Cundinamarca.
 Termales del Zipa, Tabio, Cundinamarca.
 Termales de Tenjo, Cundinamarca.
 Termales de Machetá, Cundinamarca.
 Termales Aguas Calientes, vía al Llano, Cundinamarca.
 Termales de San Vicente, Santa Rosa de Cabal, Risaralda.
 Termales de Santa Rosa, Santa Rosa de Cabal, Risaralda.
 Termales Tambujina, La Cruz, Narino.
 Termales Cascada Zetaquira, Boyaca
 Termales de Paipa, Boyaca
 Termales de Iza, Boyaca
 Termales de Las Juntas, Ibague, Tolima.
 Termales Agua Hirviendo, Puracé, Cauca.
 Aguas Termales El Raizón, Norte de Santander.

Costa Rica 
 La Sierra de Abangares, Guanacaste. 
 Tabacón, near Arenal Volcano.
 Orosí Valley, near Cartago.
 Rincón de la Vieja Volcano & National Park, Guanacaste.
 Baldi hot springs [Alajuela Province].

Dominican Republic 
 Aguas Calientes Parque De Aguas Termas Naturales Los Montones, San José de las Matas.

Ecuador 

 Aguas Hediondas, near Tulcán, Carchi Province
 Baños de Agua Santa, Tungurahua Province
 Baños, Azuay Province
 Baños de San Vicente, near Salinas, Santa Elena Province
 Chachimbiro, near Ibarra, Imbabura Province
 Nangulví, near Otavalo, Imbabura Province
 Oyacachi, near Papallacta, Napo Province
 Papallacta, Napo Province

El Salvador 
 Salto de Malacatiupan, near Santa Ana, Santa Ana Department
 Los Ausoles near Ahuachapan, Ahuachapan Department
 Thermales de Santa Teresa, near Ahuachapan, Ahuachapan Department

Greenland 
There are numerous hot springs in Greenland:
 Uunartoq Island, near Alluitsup Paa
 Disko Island (it has over 2000 hot springs)

Guatemala 
 Fuentes Georginas, Quetzaltenango
 Santa Teresita near Antigua Guatemala, in Amatitlán

Mexico 
 Abasolo, Guanajuato
 Aguascalientes, Aguascalientes
 El Géiser in Tecozautla
 El Pandeño (aka San José de Pandos), outside the towns of Julimes & San Diego de Alcalá, Chihuahua
 Guadalupe Canyon Hot Springs, Mexicali
 Imala, Sinaloa
 La Gruta in San Miguel de Allende, Guanajuato
 Los Azufres, Michoacán
 Mission San Borja Hot Springs, East of the town of Rosarito, Baja California
 Ojo de Dolores & La Cueva del Diablo, in Jiménez, Chihuahua
 Russian Valley Hot Springs South of Tecate in Baja California
 Tlacotlapilco, Hidalgo
 Valle Chico Hot Springs, Southwest of San Felipe

Peru 

 Ayacucho Region 
 Cajamarca 
 Monterrey Hot Spring, Carhuaz 
 La Calera Springs, Chivay 
 Colca Canyon Hot Springs, near Coporaque, Peru. 
 Huayhuash, in the Andes 
 Hot springs, Pachia, Tacna
 Machu Picchu Pueblo (known colloquially as Aguas Calientes), near Machu Picchu 
 Moyobamba Region 
 Shanay-Timpishka
 Zorritos, near Bocapán Beach.

United States

Alaska
 Akutan Hot Springs
 Baranof Warm Springs (thermal mineral springs), 57°0522″N 134°4959″W, (nine springs from lukewarm to 120 degrees F)
 Chena Hot Springs (thermal mineral springs), 65°311″N 146°320″W
 Circle Hot Springs, 65°2900″N 144°3803″W
 Kanuti Hot Springs
 Manley Hot Springs, 65°028″N 150°3736″W
 Tolovana Hot Springs, 65°160″N 148°520″W

Arizona
 Arizona (Ringbolt) Hot Springs
 Buckhorn Baths, Mesa
 Castle Hot Springs, 33°5857.9″N 112°2142.84″W
 Gold Strike Hot Springs
 Hot Well Dunes
 Indian Hot Springs
 Palm Pool Waterfall Hot Springs
 Pumpkin Spring (hot springs in Grand Canyon)
 Roper Lake State Park Hot Spring
 San Carlos Warm Springs
 Sheep Bridge Warm Spring
 Tonopah, 33°2937″N 112°5614″W, (70 °F/21 °C to 120 °F/49 °C)
 Verde Hot Springs, 34°2125.2″N 111°4236″W, (92° to 104 °F)

Arkansas
 Hot Springs, 34°2950″N 93°319″W

California

 Avila Hot Springs, Avila
 Big Bend Hot Springs, 41°111″N 121°5428″W
 Big Caliente Hot Springs
 Bumpass Hell Creek, Lassen National Park
 Calistoga
 Calistoga Spa Hot Springs
 Campbell Hot Springs, Sierraville CA
 Coso Hot Springs, Inyo County
 Crabtree Hot Springs, on Rice Fork Eel River 
 Desert Hot Springs (thermal mineral springs)
 Deep Creek Hot Springs
 Delonegha Hot Springs
 Franklin Hot Springs, Paso Robles, California
 Gilroy Yamato Hot Springs
 Grover Hot Springs State Park
 Harbin Hot Springs, Middletown
 Hot Creek
 Jordan Hot Springs
 Keough Hot Springs
 Mammoth Hot Springs
 Matilija Hot Springs
 Mercey Hot Springs
 Miracle Hot Springs
 Mono Hot Springs
 Murrieta Hot Springs
 Palm Springs
 Remington Hot Springs
 Saline Valley Hot Springs
 Slates Hot Springs, Esalen
 Tassajara Hot Springs
 Travertine Hot Springs
 Sespe Hot Springs
 Scovern Hot Springs
 Warner Springs
 Wilbur Hot Springs, in Colusa County
 Willett Hot Springs

Colorado

 Conundrum Hot Springs
 Hot Sulphur Springs
 Idaho Springs
 Glenwood Springs
 Ouray
 Pagosa hot springs (110 °F to 144 °F/62 °C), 37°165″N 107°128″W
 Penny Hot Springs
 Steamboat Springs

Florida
 Warm Mineral Springs

Georgia
 Radium Springs (20 °C, 68 °F)
 Warm Springs (90 °F)

Idaho
 Boat Box Hot Spring
 Frenchman's Hot Springs
 Goldbug Hot Springs
 Green Canyon Hot Springs
 Heise Hot Springs, Ririe (28 °C, 82 °F)
 Lava Hot Springs (thermal mineral springs)
 Silver Creek Hot Spring
 Stanley Hot Springs
 Sunflower Hot Springs

Illinois
 Little Hot Springs of Illinois

Massachusetts
 Sand Spring (75 °F / 24 °C)

Montana
 Chico Hot Springs (104 °F / 40 °C)
 Gregson Hot Springs
 Hot Springs
 Hunters Hot Springs
 Lolo Hot Springs Montana
 Sleeping Buffalo Hot Springs

Nevada

New Mexico
 Black Rock Hot Springs, near Taos
 Faywood Hot Springs
 Soda Dam Hot Spring
 Jordan Hot Springs (Gila National Forest)
 Manby Hot Springs, near Taos
 McCauley Hot Springs, Jemez Springs
 Melanie Hot Springs, near Silver City
 Middle Fork Hot Springs (Gila National Forest)
 Montezuma Hot Springs
 Ojo Caliente Hot Springs, Ojo Caliente
 Radium Hot Springs
 San Antonio Hot Springs, Jemez Springs
 Spence Hot Spring, Jemez Springs
 Stagecoach Hot Springs, near Aroyo Hondo, NM
 Truth or Consequences Hot Springs
 Turkey Creek Hot Springs (Gila National Forest)

New York
 Lebanon Springs
 Saratoga Springs (Roosevelt Spring, Lincoln Spring, etc.)

North Carolina
 Hot Springs

Oregon

 Alvord Hot Springs
 Antelope Hot Springs
 Bagby Hot Springs
 Belknap Hot Springs
 Breitenbush Hot Springs (thermal mineral springs)
 Cougar Hot Springs
 Deer Creek Hot Springs
 Hart Mountain Hot Springs
 Hot Lake Springs
 Hunters Hot Springs
 McCredie Hot Springs
 Mickey Hot Springs
 Summer Lake Hot Springs
 Umpqua Hot Springs

South Dakota
 Hot Springs

Texas
 Chinati Hot Springs, near Ruidosa
 Hot Springs (Big Bend National Park)

Utah
 Baker Hot Springs, Fumarole Butte, Juab County
 Blue Lake, Wendover
 Crystal Hot Springs, Honeyville
 Fifth Water Hot Springs, Three Forks Trailhead, Diamond Fork Canyon, Uinta National Forest
 Homestead, Midway
 Meadow Hot Springs
 Mystic Hot Springs, Monroe also known as Monroe Hot Springs and Cooper Hot Springs
 Pa Tempe Hot Springs, La Verkin
 Saratoga Springs
 Veyo Pool, Veyo

Virginia
 Warm Springs
 Hot Springs

Washington
 Olympic Hot Springs
 Scenic Hot Springs
 Sol Duc Hot Springs
 Carson Hot Springs

West Virginia
 Berkeley Springs State Park

Wyoming
 Black Sand Basin Hot Springs
 Boiling River (Yellowstone National Park)
 Brilliant Pool Hot Springs
 Hot Springs State Park, Thermopolis
 Mammoth Hot Springs
 Morning Glory Pool
 Saratoga

A list of 1661 hot springs in the United States can be found on the NOAA Thermal Springs List for the United States. The same list with added notes and links can be found on the USA Hotsprings Database.

Uruguay 

Termas de Almirón
 Termas del Arapey
 Termas del Daymán
 Termas del Guaviyú
 Termas de San Nicanor

Venezuela 
 Las Trincheras
 El Pilar (Rio Aguas Calientes)
 El Borbollon

Antarctica 
 Deception Island

Asia

Bhutan

 Punakha
 Chuboog Tshachu
 Koma Tshachu
 Gasa
 Gasa Tsachu
 Wachey Tsachu
 Gayza Tshachu
 Bumthang
 Dhur Tshachu
 Zhemgang
 Duenmang Tshachu
 Sarpang
 Gelephu Tshachu
 Lhuntse
 Khambalung gNey Tshachu
 Yoenten Kuenjung Tshachu
 Pasalum Tshachu

China 
 Tangchi Hot Spring and Xianning Hot Spring, Hubei Province
 Conghua Hot Spring and Zhongshan Hot Spring, Guangdong Province
 Anbo Hot Spring and Laotieshan Hot Spring, Dalian
 Wulongbei Hot Spring, Dandong
 Tanggangzi Hot Spring, Anshan
 Xiongyue Hot Spring, Yingkou, Liaoning Province
 Xanxi Hot Spring, Ningbo-Ninghai, Zhejiang Province
 Hailuogou Hot Spring, Sichuan Province
 Jinping Mengla Hot Spring, Yunnan Province
 Longsheng Hot Spring, Guangxi Province
 Tibet Paillong Hot Spring, Tibet Province

India

Assam
 Garampani, Garampani Wildlife Sanctuary, Karbi Anglong district, Assam

Bihar
 Rajgir, Nalanda, Bihar
 Suryakund, Near Gaya, Bihar
 Sita Kund Hot Spring
 Rishi Kund

Gujarat
Geological Survey of India has found 17 hot springs in Gujarat:
 Lasundra, Kathlal Taluka, Kheda district, Gujarat
 Tuwa, Godhra Taluka, Panchmahal district, Gujarat
 Kavi/Kawa, Jambuasar Taluka, Bharuch district, Gujarat
 Unai near Vansda, Gujarat
 Tulsishyam near Tulsishyam temple, Gir Forest, Junagadh district, Gujarat
 Savarkundla
 Lalpur
 Dholera
 Other dormant springs are located at Chabsar, Cambay Wells, Ghogha, Harsan,  Khedapad, Khar, Maktapar, Warha and Mithapur.

Haryana

Himachal Pradesh

 Tattapani, Karsog, Mandi, Himachal Pradesh
 Manikaran, Kullu, Himachal Pradesh
 Vashisht, Kullu, Himachal Pradesh
 Akhara Bazaar, Kullu, Himachal Pradesh
 Kasol Kullu Himachal Pradesh
 Kheerganga, Parvati Valley, Himachal Pradesh

Jammu & Kashmir
 Tatapani, Barmandal Kalakot Rajouri Jammu and Kashmir.

Jharkhand
 Gandhaunia, near Mandu, Ramgarh district, Jharkhand

Karnataka
 Bendru Theertha, Puttur, Karnataka

Ladakh
 Chumathang, Ladakh
 Hot Springs, Chang Chenmo Valley, Ladakh

Madhya Pradesh
 Chavalpani Near Pachmarhi, Madhya Pradesh.
 Babeha, Mandla-Jabalpur Road, MP (now submerged under catchment water of Bargi Dam on river Narmada)

Maharashtra
 Ganeshpuri, Akloli, Vajreshwari
 Unapdev, and Sunapdeo Maharashtra
 Unhavare, Near Dapoli, Maharashtra
 Unhere Kund, Near Pali, Maharashtra
 Unkeshwar hot spring, Located at Unkeshwar Village in Kinwat Taluka, Dist. Nanded (M.S.)
 Boisar Kokanee Hot Springs

Odisha
 Taptapani near Berhampur, Atri near Bhubaneswar, on Tarabalo in Nayagarh District of Orissa
 Atri hot spring, Khordha, Odisha. 42 km from Bhubaneshwar
 Deulajhari hot spring, Angul, Odisha.

Sikkim
 Sikkim has many hot springs including:
 Phurchachu (Reshi)
 Yumthang
 Borang
 Ralang
 Taram-chu
 Yumey Samdong.
 All these hot springs have high sulfur content and are located near the river banks.

West Bengal
 Bakreshwar, Birbhum, West Bengal

Indonesia

Bali
 Banyuwedang (Gerokgak, Buleleng)
 Yeh Panes Panetahan (Tabanan Regency)

Java
 Cangar, Mount Arjuna, Malang
 Ciater, Subang, West Java
 Cipanas, Garut, West Java
 Cisolok, Pelabuhan Ratu, West Java
 Maribaya Hot Spring, Lembang
 Pacet, Mojokerto
 Pancuran Tujuh, Mount Slamet, Central Java
 Parang Wedang, Parangtritis

Lesser Sunda Islands
 Mengurada Hot Spring, Bajawa city, Flores

Maluku Islands
 There are two hot springs on Ambon, Maluku.

Sumatra
 Gemuhak, Muara Anip Regency, South Sumatra
 Semurup, Air Hangat Subdistrict, Kerinci
 Danau Linting (Hot Spring Lake about 8000 m2 near tiga juhar village), Deli Serdang, North Sumatera.
 Dolok Tinggi Raja white crater, Simalungun District, North Sumatera. Dubbed mini Pamukkale or mini Yellowstone.
 Sibayak Hot Spring (at Lau Debuk-Debuk Village), Karo District, North Sumatera.
 Sei Wampu Hot Spring (White Water Hot Spring at Wampu River near Marike Estate of PTPN II), Langkat, North Sumatera.
 Sei Batang Serangan Hot Spring (at Ekowisata Tangkahan), Langkat, North Sumatera.
 Tarutung Hot Spring (many Hot Spring Like Hutabarat, Sipaholon), North Tapanuli, North Sumatera.
 Ie Seum (Aceh Language: Hot Water), near Port Malayahati Krueng Raya, Aceh Besar, Nanggroe Aceh Darussalam.

Israel 

 Ein Gedi
 Tiberias
 Hamat Gader
 Hamei Yoav
 Hamei Ga'ash

Iran 
 Ferdows Hot Spring
 Sar-Ein Hot Springs more than 20 traditional and modern thermal springs)
 Kousar Hot Spring
 Sardabeh Hot Spring
 Meshkin Shahr (Ghoutor Soee. Ilanjigh, Gheynarjeh, Shabil)

Japan 

Being located in the "Pacific Ring of Fire", Japan is in a volcanic region, and is home to many hot springs. The onsen (a Japanese word for "hot spring") plays a notable role in Japanese culture.

In March 2003 it was reported that there were 3,102 spa resorts in 2,292 municipalities in Japan. There were also 15,400 lodging facilities with 6,740 public hot spring baths. About 138 million people a year visit these facilities.

Noted hot springs areas in Japan
 Arima Onsen, Hyogo
 Atami, Shizuoka
 Beppu, Oita see Hells of Beppu and Beppu Onsen
 Gero, Gifu, Gifu
 Hakone, Kanagawa see also Ōwakudani
 Ikaho, Gumma also known as Ikaho Onsen, Kogane-no-Yu (The Golden Waters), Kodakara-no-Yu (Child Waters)
 Kinugawa, Tochigi Kinugawa Onsen
 Kirishima, Kagoshima
 Kusatsu, Gunma
 Noboribetsu, Hokkaido Jigokudani, or Hell Valley, the main source of the Noboribetsu onsen
 Nyuto, Akita
 Shibu, Nagano
 Shirahama, Wakayama see Nanki-Shirahama Onsen and Tsubaki Onsen.
 Shuzenji Onsen
 Toyako, Shikotsu-Toya National Park, Hokkaido
 Yunomine Onsen, Tanabe, Wakayama, site of the UNESCO World Heritage Tsuboyu bath
 Yufuin, Oita
 Unzen Onsen

Disputed territory between Japan and Russia
 Iturup Baransky volcano Hot Springs

Korea 
 Heosimcheong Spa
 Yusong Foot Spa, near Daejon, South Korea.

Kyrgyzstan 
 Issyk-kul
 Jeti-Ögüz resort

Malaysia 

Various hot springs, all nonvolcanic. They include –

Johor
 Grisek, 10 km from Parit Jawa, Muar district
 Labis

Kedah
 Air hangat, Langkawi

Malacca
 Gadek Hot Spring
 Jasin Hot Spring

Negeri Sembilan
 Pedas Hot Spring
 Chengkau Hot Spring

Pahang
 Bentong
 Gunung Tapis, Sungai Lembing

Perak
 Sg Klah, developed commercially
 Kampung Ulu Slim
 Lost World Of Tambun- HotSprings & Spa
 Mangong, Kuala Kangsar
 Ayer Panas, Grik
 Pengkalan Hulu

Sabah
 Poring hot springs, Kinabalu National Park

Sarawak
 Annah Rais Hot Springs, Padawan
 Kampung Panchor Dayak, Padawan
 Paku Hotspring, Bau

Selangor
 Selayang, 15 km north of Kuala Lumpur
 Kalumpang, south of Tanjung Malim, north of Kerling
 Ulu Tamu, near Tanjung Malim
 Kerling, near Batang Kali

Terengganu
 LA hot spring, Besut

Nepal 
 Hotiyana in Sankhuwasabha, Koshi zone, Eastern Nepal.
 Syabrubesi and Chilime in Rasuwa, North of Kathmandu.
 Bhurung, Do Khola, Singha, Chhumrung and Dhadkharka in Myagdi district.
 Jomsom and Dhima in Mustang.
 Chame and La Ta in Manang district.
 Bhulbhule Khar in Tanahu district.
 Tapoban in Bajhang district.
 Dhanachauri (Luma) and Tila river in Jumla.
 Srikaar, Sina and Chamlaiya in Darchula.
 Riar, Saghu Khola, Sarai Khola in Middle development region of Nepal.

Oman 

 Athawarah Hot Spring

Pakistan 
 Chitral-Garam Chashma
 Chitral - Gobore, Pech uch and Yurjogh
 Tatta Pani Kotli AJK
 Mandi Nara Kotli AJK
 Thandani Abbotabad
 Nara Matora Kahuta

Philippines 
 Mainit Hot Spring
 Mambukal Mountain Resort: hot soda and sulfur springs slightly above 30 °C.
 Puning Hot Spring, in Sitio Puning, Barangay Inararo, Municipality of Porac, Pampanga Province; accessed through Sitio Target, Barangay Sapang Bato, Angeles City

Singapore 
 Sembawang Hot Spring Park
 Pulau Tekong

Sri Lanka 
About 10 thermal springs have been identified in Sri Lanka.
 Rankihiriya
 Kanniya Hot water spring
 Nelumwewa/Galwewa
 Mutugalwela
 Kapurella
 Maha-oya
 Marangala
 Embilinne
 Kivulegama
 Maha-pelessa

Taiwan 

 Chiao Hsi
 Beitou
 Dakeng
 Green island — undersea spas.
 Guguan
 Guanziling Hot Spring
 Jhiben Hot Spring
 Jiaoxi
 Ruisui, Hualien
 Sichongxi Hot Spring
 Tai-an Hot Spring
 Yangmingshan
 Wulai
 Zhaori Hot Spring

Thailand 
 Thai Prachan Hot Spring
 Bo Khloung Hot Stream
 Ban Pong Krathing Hot Spring (Ban Bueng Hot Spring)
 Pong Krathing Hot Spring
 Jae Son hot spring
 Muang Paeng hot spring
 Pa Bong hot spring
 Ban Huay Zai Kao Hot Spring
 Wieng Pa Pao hot spring
 Rung Arun hot spring
 Krabi hot spring (Nuae Khlong)
 Khlong Thom hot stream (hot spring)

Tibet Autonomous Region 
 Yangbajing hot springs

Turkey 
 Adapazarı
 Ayder, Rize
 Sandıklı, Afyon
 Balçova, Izmir
 Bolu
 Bursa
 Çamlıhemşin, Rize
 Çeşme, Izmir
 Denizli
 Gönen, Balikesir
 Kangal, Sivas
 Kızılcahamam, Ankara
 Köyceğiz, Muğla
 Kütahya
 Pamukkale, Denizli
 Yalova
 Balıkesir, Akçay

Vietnam 
There are over 280 hot springs in Vietnam.
 Kim Boi, Hòa Bình Province
 Nha Trang
 Bình Châu, Bà Rịa–Vũng Tàu province
 Bang Spa, Quảng Bình Province

Europe

Albania
Banjat e Bënjës, near Petran

Azores 

 São Miguel island hot springs
 Caldeira Velha, near Lagoa do Fogo nature park with two thermal springs
 Poca da Dona Beija, 82 °F to 102 °F
 Ponta da Ferraria, hot springs cove with underwater hydrothermal vents at the ocean front
 Terra Nostra Park, 95 to 113°F, soaking pool built in 1700s
 Caldeira das Furnas, high sulphur content with characteristic sulphuric scent

Belgium 
 Chaudfontaine

Bulgaria 
 Velingrad
 Narechen
 Kyustendil
 Sapareva Banya
 Bedenski bani
 Sandanski
 in and around Sofia (Bankya)
 Pomorie
 Pavel Banya
 Hissarya

Czech Republic 
 Karlovy Vary
 Teplice

Georgia 
 Tbilisi, Sulphur Baths

Germany 
 Aachen, 74 degrees C, 165 degrees F
 Bad Oeynhausen, 36 degrees C, 97 degrees F, with a depth of 725 m and 3000 L/min largest carbonated brine water source in the world.
 Wiesbaden, 66 degrees C, 151 degrees F

Greece

Hungary 

 Lake Hévíz is the largest thermal lake in Europe. It is close to the city of Hévíz, Hungary. The lake water temperatures range between 23 and 25 °C in winter and 33–36 °C in summer.
 Miskolctapolca
 Egerszalók
 Harkány
 Csokonyavisonta
 Zalakaros
 Bogács
 Sárvár
 Hajdúszoboszló
 Budapest, Rudas
 Budapest, Széchenyi
 Bükfürdő
 Bükkszék
 Mezőkövesd
 Igal
 Csisztapuszta
 Jászárokszállás

Iceland 

 Blue Lagoon, Grindavík, 36 °C
 Deildartunguhver 97 °C
 Geysir hot springs
 Kualaug hot spring
 Reykjadalur Hot Spring Thermal River
 Hrunalaug (Hruni hot springs)
 Brimketill lava rock pool
 Gunnuhver Hot Springs
 Guðrúnarlaug hot spring
 Hellulaug
 Pollurinn hot springs
 Grjótagjá
 Mývatn Nature Baths
 Hveravellir
 Hveragerði
 Hverir
 Seltún Hot Springs
 Sky Lagoon

Italy 
 Abano Terme, Veneto, 130 hot springs
 Aeolian Islands, Sicily, hot springs
 Arta Terme, Friuli Venezia Giulia, sulphurous springs
 Bagni di Craveggia, Valle Onsernone, hot springs, 28 degrees C
 Bagni di Lucca, Tuscany, thermal springs
 Bagni di Tivoli, Lazio, sulphurous springs
 Baiae, ancient Roman volcanic hot springs town on the shore of the Gulf of Naples, now partially submerged.
 Bormio, Sondrio Province, Lombardy (geothermal spa), 36–43 degrees C
 Brisighella, Emilia Romagna, sulphorus waters
 Caramanico Terme, Abruzzi, two springs
 Ischia, Campania, volcanic heat source
 Islands Sciacca, Sicily, sulphurous waters
 Montecatini Terme, Tuscany, thermal springs
 Montegrotto Terme, Veneto
 Piemonte Acqui Terme, Piedmont, sulphurous spring
 Santa Cesarea Terme, Lecce Province, Apulia Region, coastal thermal spring along the Adriatic Sea
 Saturnia, Southern Tuscany, 37 degrees Celsius pouring out at 800 litres per second into terraced pools that are free to dip in day or night
 Spezzano Albanese, Cosenza, Calabria
 Tabiano Terme, Lombardy, sulphurous springs
 Viterbo, Lazio, sulphurous springs
 Termini Imerese, Sicily, sulphur springs

North Macedonia
 Negorski Banji
 Banja Banishte
 Banja Bansko
 Banja Kežovica
 Banja Car Samoil
 Katlanovska Banja
 Banja Kochani
 Debarski Banji
 Kumanovska Banja
 Banja Strnovec

Norway 
 Northwest Spitsbergen National Park, Spitsbergen at 80°N, contains two of Earth's most northerly hot springs, including Troll Hot Springs and Jotun Hot Springs.

Portugal 
 Ponta da Ferraria, Azores, ocean hot springs
 Monumento Natural da Caldeira Velha, Azores
 Parque Terra Nostra, Azores
 Poça Dona Beija, Azores
 Caldas de Vizela, Braga District

Romania 
 Băile Felix, 20–48 degrees C
 Sânmihaiu Român, 66 degrees C
 Băile Herculane, 30–80 degrees C
 Hârșova, 30–40 degrees C
 Siriu Hot Spring at Băile Siriu, 30–60 degrees C, under water (Siriu Lake) most of the year

Russia

 Malka, Kamchatka Krai, up to 
 Yessentuki, 
 Iturup Baransky Volcano Hot Springs (disputed territory between Russia and Japan)

Serbia 
 Vranjska Banja, 96 degrees C (205 degrees F), in the depth up to 111 degrees C (232 degrees F) – the world hottest spring.
 Jošanička Banja, 78 °C, the second hottest spring in Serbia
 Sijarinska Banja, 18 different springs with temperatures between 16 and 71 °C and a natural 8 meter tall geyser around an artificial pool.
 Kuršumlijska banja, 58 °C
 Lukovska banja, 56 °C, located at an altitude of 700 m
 Niška banja, 39 °C
 Mataruška banja, 38–40 °C

Slovakia 
123 hot springs with temperature above 25 degrees C (77 degrees F).
 Veľký Meder, 94 degrees C (201 degrees F) – the hottest spring in Slovakia
 Spa Bešeňová

 Spa Bojnice, 9 springs, up to 52 degrees C (126 degrees F)
 Číž – spring BČ 3, 32 degrees C (89 degrees F)
 Dudince, 28 degrees C (82 degrees F)
 Spa Kováčová, 49 degrees C (120 degrees F)
 Liptovský Ján – 14 springs, 15 – 29 degrees C (59 – 85 degrees F)
 Spa Lúčky, 32 degrees C (88 degrees F)
 Spa Piešťany, 67 – 69 degrees C (153 – 156 degrees F)
 Spa Rajecké Teplice, 38 degrees C (100 degrees F)
 Sklené Teplice, several hot springs, 28 – 53 degrees C (82 – 127 degrees F)
 Spa Sliač, several springs, up to 33 degrees C (92 degrees F)
 Spa Trenčianske Teplice, several hot springs, up to 40 degrees C (104 degrees F)
 Spa Turčianske Teplice, several hot springs, up to 47 degrees C (116 degrees F)
 Spa Vyšné Ružbachy, several springs, up to 22 degrees C (72 degrees F)

Spain 
 Alhama de Granada, Andalusia
 Alhama de Almería, Andalusia
 Caldes de Montbui, Barcelona, Catalonia
 Caldes de Malavella, Girona, Catalonia
 Caldas de Reis, Galicia
 Ourense, Galicia
 Panticosa, Huesca
 Torneiros, Galicia (Spain)
 Fuente Santa, La Palma, Canarias.
 La Hermida, Cantabria

United Kingdom 

There are many geothermal springs in the UK, but the hot springs found in the town of Bath, Somerset are the only true hot springs (defined as those hotter than 37 degrees C):
 Bath
 Cross Bath, 42.8 °C, 109 °F
 Stall Street Fountain, 45.4 °C, 113.7 °F
 Hetling Spring, 45.4 °C, 113.7 °F
 King's Bath, 45.6 °C, 114 °F
 Hot Bath, 47.2 °C, 117 °F

Other thermal or warm springs in the UK include:
 Taff's Well Thermal Spring. Cardiff, South Wales. 21.6 °C, 70.9 °F
 St Ann's Well, Buxton, Derbyshire 28 °C, 82.4 °F
 Hotwells spring in Bristol 25 °C, 77 °F
 Matlock Bath warm spring, 20°C / 68°F 
 Buxton Baths warm spring, 27°C / 80°F

Oceania

Australia 
Hot springs can be found in all six states of Australia as well as the Northern Territory; but apparently not Australian Capital Territory.
 Dalhousie Springs in South Australia 38–43 degrees C.
 Elizabeth Springs in Queensland
 Hastings Caves and Thermal Springs in Tasmania 28 degrees C is located south of Hobart.
 Innot Hot Springs in Queensland
 Kimberley Warm Springs near Devonport, Tasmania 25 degrees C.
 Mataranka Hot Springs, Katherine Hot Springs, Tjuwaliyn (Douglas) Hot Springs in the Northern Territory
 Muckadilla Hot Springs, near Roma, Queensland
 Paralana Hot Springs, near Arkaroola, South Australia, issue at 62 degrees C from uranium-rich granite, and contain radon.
 Peninsula Hot Springs in Victoria. Located on the Mornington Peninsula.
 Pilliga, Moree, Lightning Ridge in New South Wales.
 Zebedee Springs within El Questro Station, and Bibawarra Bore near Carnarvon, Western Australia.

Fiji 
Hot springs are in the town of Savusavu where local people use the hot springs to cook their food.  Some of the springs are situated on the beach and steam can be seen rising from the water at low tide.

New Zealand 

There are numerous hot springs in New Zealand, predominantly in the Taupō Volcanic Zone, and in particular around Rotorua. Well known springs outside the Taupō Volcanic Zone include:
 Hanmer Springs
 Hot Water Beach
 Maruia Springs
 Morere Hotsprings in Wairoa District, Hawke's Bay
 Ngawha Springs
 The Lost Spring in Whitianga, Coromandel Peninsula
 Waimangu Volcanic Rift Valley
 Frying Pan Lake now known as Waimangu Cauldron
 Pink and White Terraces
 Waingaro
 Waiotapu
 Waiwera
 Welcome Flat, on the Copland Track
 Whakarewarewa

Hot springs parks 
It is common to create parks around hot springs:
 Shikotsu-Toya National Park in Hokkaidō, Japan
 Yangmingshan National Park in Taiwan
 Banff National Park and Jasper National Park in Canada
 Gorongosa National Park in Mozambique
Sembawang Hot Spring Park in Mandai, Singapore
 Yankari Games Reserve in Bauchi, Nigeria
 Sitakunda Eco Park in Sitakunda, Bangladesh
United States
 Arkansas
 Hot Springs National Park
 California
 Death Valley National Park
 Lassen Volcanic National Park
 Idaho, Montana & Wyoming
 Yellowstone National Park
 Texas
 Big Bend National Park
 Washington
 Olympic National Park

See also 

 List of spa towns
 List of hot springs in the United States
 List of Hot Springs and Mineral Springs of Bhutan

References

External links 

 List of "natural" hot springs worldwide for soaking and bathing

Bathing
Geography-related lists
Lists of tourist attractions